Anthichuvappu is a 1984 Indian Malayalam film, directed and produced by Kurian Varnasala. The film stars Mammootty, Mohan Elias, Shankar, Jalaja and Sankaradi in the lead roles. The film has musical score by A. T. Ummer.

Cast
Mammootty
Mohan Elias (Sumesh)
Shankar
Jalaja
Sankaradi
Mala Aravindan

Soundtrack
The music was composed by A. T. Ummer and the lyrics were written by Poovachal Khader.

References

External links
 

1984 films
1980s Malayalam-language films